There are two species of skink named spotted ctenotus. Spotted ctenotus may refer to:

 Ctenotus olympicus, found in Australia
 Ctenotus uber,  found in Western Australia